The 2002 International Formula 3000 season was the thirty-sixth season of the second-tier of Formula One feeder championship and also eighteenth season under the International Formula 3000 Championship moniker. It featured the 2002 FIA Formula 3000 International Championship which was contested over twelve races from 30 March to 14 September 2002. Championship titles were awarded for both Drivers and Teams.

Teams and drivers 
The following teams and drivers contested the 2002 FIA Formula 3000 International Championship.

Note: Each entry used a Lola B02/50 chassis with a Zytek-Judd KV engine and Avon tyres, as mandated by the championship regulations.

Calendar
The FIA Formula 3000 International Championship was contested over twelve races.

Note: The race time/average speed for the provisional winner of Race 10 (Tomáš Enge) was 0'59:24.642/152.546 km/h. Enge was subsequently disqualified after failing a drug test.

Championship standings

Teams Championship
Teams Championship points were awarded on a 10-6-4-3-2-1 basis for the first six places at each race with points from both team cars counting towards each team’s total.

Race results
Drivers Championship points were awarded at each race as follows: 10 points to the winner, 6 for runner-up, 4 for third place, 3 for fourth place, 2 for fifth place and 1 for sixth place.

Notes
Tomáš Enge was disqualified from first place in Hungary after failing a drug test.
Antônio Pizzonia was disqualified from second place at Monza in Italy for running a rear wing element upside-down.
Alexander Müller was disqualified from sixth place at Monaco when his car was found to be underweight.

References

Further reading
 Automobile Year 2002/2003, pages 234–238 & 270

External links
 Teams and drivers at www.f3000.com 
 Season review at www.carenthusiast.com
 Race results at www.teamdan.com 
 Images at www.f3000.com 

International Formula 3000
International Formula 3000 seasons
Formula 3000